David Calderhead (19 June 1864 – 9 January 1938) was a Scottish football player and manager. Calderhead played for Queen of the South Wanderers, Notts County and Lincoln City. He won the FA Cup with Notts County in 1894 and was capped once for Scotland, in 1889. He then became a manager, working for Lincoln City (1900–1907) and Chelsea (1907–1933).

Playing career
Calderhead was a centre half and played for various clubs, including Dumfries team Queen of the South Wanderers (not to be confused with Queen of the South, formed in 1919). He won one Scotland cap, in a 7–0 win against Ireland at the first Ibrox Park in the British Home Championship in March 1889; this attracted Notts County.

With Notts County he played in two FA Cup finals: the Blackburn Rovers side of Thomas Mitchell were 3–1 winners in 1891, but Calderhead got his hands on the trophy in 1894 after a 4–1 victory over Bolton Wanderers.

Management career
He then moved into management, taking over at Lincoln City in 1900. In leading his side to a shock replayed win over Chelsea in the first round of 1906–07 FA Cup, he impressed the west London club's board enough for them to appoint him manager later that year. Norrie Fairgray made the same move in the same year to play for Calderhead at both clubs.

Calderhead was Chelsea's first full-time secretary-manager and spent almost 26 years at the club, making him the club's longest-serving manager. Chelsea were relegated in 1909–10 and promoted back to the First Division in 1911–12. Calderhead took Chelsea to their first FA Cup final, in 1915, but in a match overshadowed by the First World War they were beaten by Sheffield United 0–3 at Old Trafford. During the war, Chelsea won the unofficial London Combination twice, as well as the War Fund Cup.

The 1919–20 season was Chelsea's most successful under Calderhead, finishing 3rd in the First Division and reaching the FA Cup semi-finals, where they lost to Aston Villa. The club were relegated again in 1923–24 and, after a succession of near-misses,  the side of Willie Ferguson, Tommy Law and Andy Wilson were promoted again in 1929–30. 1931–32 brought a further FA Cup semi final. Tommy Lang inspired Newcastle to a 2-goal lead and despite Gallacher pulling a goal back, Newcastle progressed to the final.

Calderhead was notoriously shy of the media, earning the nickname "The Sphinx of Stamford Bridge". Nevertheless, The Times described him as "one of the managers who started the fashion of paying huge transfer fees and was responsible for bringing many celebrated players to Stamford Bridge, including [Hughie] Gallacher and [Alex] Jackson." Gallacher, Jackson and Alec Cheyne were purchased for a combined £30,000 in the summer of 1930. In March 1910, in an (unsuccessful) bid to stave off relegation, Calderhead's Chelsea spent the then-considerable sum of £3000 on new players. Despite the big spending on glamorous players, the club failed to win a major trophy during Calderhead's tenure.

Calderhead holds the record at Chelsea for managing games – 966. He left the job in June 1933 to be replaced by Leslie Knighton. Calderhead died five years after leaving Chelsea in London at the age of 73.

His son, also called David, played for Chelsea while his father was manager and later took charge of Lincoln City.

Honours

Player
Notts County
FA Cup 
Winner: 1894
Runner-up: 1891

Manager
Chelsea
FA Cup runner up : 1915

References

1864 births
1938 deaths
Footballers from East Ayrshire
Notts County F.C. players
Lincoln City F.C. players
Lincoln City F.C. managers
Chelsea F.C. managers
Scottish footballers
Scottish football managers
Scotland international footballers
English Football League representative players
Association football central defenders
English Football League players
FA Cup Final players
Queen of the South Wanderers F.C. players